Podocinum is a genus of mites in the family Podocinidae. There are more than 30 described species in Podocinum.

Species
These 31 species belong to the genus Podocinum:

 Podocinum aciculatum Evans & Hyatt, 1958
 Podocinum agilis Arutunyan, 1974
 Podocinum anhuense Wen, 1965
 Podocinum aokii
 Podocinum bengalensis Bhattacharyya, 1968
 Podocinum catenulum De Leon, 1964
 Podocinum catenum Ishikawa, 1970
 Podocinum changchunense Liang, 1993
 Podocinum guizhouense Yan & Jin, 2011
 Podocinum hainanense Liang, 1993
 Podocinum jamaicense Evans & Hyatt, 1958
 Podocinum jianfenglingense Liang, 1993
 Podocinum mediocre Berlese, 1913
 Podocinum minus Berlese, 1913
 Podocinum monilicum Halliday, 1990
 Podocinum nepalense Evans & Hyatt, 1958
 Podocinum orientale Evans & Hyatt, 1958
 Podocinum pacificum Berlese, 1886
 Podocinum pintungense Ho, Ma & Wang, 2009
 Podocinum protonotum
 Podocinum pugnorum De Leon, 1964
 Podocinum ruwenzoriense Evans & Hyatt, 1958
 Podocinum sagax (Berlese, 1882)
 Podocinum sibiricum Volonikhina, 1999
 Podocinum stellatum Ma & Wang, 1998
 Podocinum sumatrense Evans & Hyatt, 1958
 Podocinum taylori Halliday, 1990
 Podocinum tianmonum Liang, 1992
 Podocinum tibetensis
 Podocinum tsushimanum
 Podocinum tupinamba

References

Acari
Articles created by Qbugbot